Imed Louati (born 11 October 1993) is a Tunisian professional footballer.

Club career

CS Sfaxien
Louati started his football career with Tunisian Ligue Professionnelle 1 club CS Sfaxien in 2012. On 1 September 2012, he made his senior debut in a league match against EGS Gafsa, coming on as a substitute for Fakhreddine Ben Youssef in the 82nd minute. He was described by Philippe Troussier, who was the manager of CS Sfaxien in 2014, as a hot prospect for the future.

Hangzhou Greentown
On 8 January 2015, CS Sfaxien announced Louati would loan to Chinese Super League side Hangzhou Greentown for six months, rejoining Philippe Troussier. Hangzhou Greentown confirmed the loan deal on 28 January. Hangzhou Greentown made the move permanent in June 2015; however, after Troussier was sacked by the club, Louati was loaned to K League Challenge side Gyeongnam FC in July 2015.

Dalkurd FF
Louati spend the fall of 2016 in Swedish second tier club Dalkurd FF. He scored three goals in five matches before he got injured and had to see the rest of the 2016-season from the stands.

Vejle Boldklub
On the 9th of February the Danish club Vejle Boldklub announced that Imed Louati had travelled to Turkey with the squad to participate in a training camp prior to the last part of the 2016/2017-season. The club announced that a free transfer would be announced during the training camp.

He scorede 10 league goals and became topscorer in Vejle Boldklub in the 2017/2018-season in which the club won promotion to Superligaen.

Vejle got relegated in the following season and announced on 10 July 2019, that Louati's contract had been terminated by mutual consent after playing 61 games in total for the club and scored 17 goals.

Hobro IK
On 13 September 2019, Louati signed a two-year contract with Hobro IK in the Danish Superliga. Louati left Hobro again at the end of the 2020-21 season.

Career statistics

Honours
CS Sfaxien
 CAF Confederation Cup: 2013
 Tunisian Ligue Professionnelle 1: 2012–13

References

External links
 
 

1993 births
People from Sfax
Living people
Association football forwards
Tunisian footballers
Tunisian expatriate footballers
CS Sfaxien players
Zhejiang Professional F.C. players
Gyeongnam FC players
Dalkurd FF players
Vejle Boldklub players
Hobro IK players
Tunisian Ligue Professionnelle 1 players
K League 2 players
Chinese Super League players
Superettan players
Danish Superliga players
Danish 1st Division players
Tunisian expatriate sportspeople in China
Expatriate footballers in China
Expatriate footballers in South Korea
Expatriate footballers in Sweden
Expatriate men's footballers in Denmark
Tunisia youth international footballers